"Learning Curve" is the 16th episode of Star Trek: Voyager and final episode of the first season. In this episode Tuvok forces some of the Maquis crew into a Starfleet training program and systems malfunction throughout the ship as the bio-neural gel packs begin to fail. It was seen by 8.3 million in the U.S. at its debut in May 1995. This episode has several guest stars including Derek McGrath as Chell, Kenny Morrison as Gerron, and Catherine McNeal as Henley. Tuvok is part of the regular cast and is played by Tim Russ.

This was written by Ronald Wilkerson and Jean Louise Matthias, and directed by David Livingston.

The episode aired on UPN on May 22, 1995.

Background and summary
The 45 minute television show was released in May 1995 and was the last show of the first season. Some of the crew of the Maquis ship Val Jean which had become part of the Voyager crew due to the destruction of their own vessel experience problems getting along with the Federation crew. They have to get trained by Tuvok to better operate aboard their new ship. Both crews are stranded on the other side of the Galaxy from Earth, after being abducted by an extra-galactic alien that abducted and medically tortured the crews of Voyager and Val Jean, killing a number of them in the process. The episode contributes to the Maquis narrative thread/story arc that cuts across  three Star Trek franchise television shows including Star Trek: The Next Generation and Star Trek: Deep Space Nine, as well as the Star Trek: Voyager this was a part of.

The episode sheds some light on the motivations of Maquis rebels, in particular crimes by the aliens known as the Cardassians. Those aliens were introduced by the Star Trek: The Next Generation episode "The Wounded" (S4E12), which also involves a character struggling with crimes committed against them personally contrasting with a Federation-Cardassian peace. Although the Maquis originated from Federation, they have since transitioned from many of its rules of conduct to a less structured chain-of-command and operations style. This provides a genesis for the episode main concepts, a resolution to the tension between these two organizational styles. Also, Neelix nearly destroys Voyager trying to make his own cheese, which is resolved by giving the ship "a fever", curing its biological systems.

Plot
After Crewman Dalby is insubordinate towards security chief Tuvok, the Vulcan discusses the situation with Captain Janeway. Janeway understands Tuvok's frustration but points out that the Maquis have never been trained in Starfleet procedures or philosophies. A class is organized to teach several Maquis crew members Starfleet protocol, taught by Tuvok, a former academy instructor. At first, his efforts are unsuccessful; the trainees walk out of their first lesson despite Tuvok's orders to stay. Later in the mess hall, Dalby makes it clear to Chakotay that he wants to do things the Maquis way. Chakotay punches Dalby, saying that if Dalby wants to do things the Maquis way then so will he, by using violence to enforce discipline. With his point made, the students return to Tuvok's training sessions.

When Tuvok shares with Neelix that he is frustrated with the Maquis's unwillingness to adapt to Starfleet protocol, Neelix indicates that perhaps it is Tuvok who is being inflexible in his strict adherence to procedure, and that perhaps if he were to "bend the rules" a little bit, the trainees would respect him more. Tuvok attempts to get to know Dalby socially, but makes little progress.

Meanwhile, it is discovered that the bioneural circuitry that runs many of the crucial systems on the ship has become infected with disease. Tuvok and the Doctor trace the infection to a batch of homemade cheese that Neelix has prepared. The Doctor discovers that the only way to kill the microbe is to heat the bioneural gel packs. The crew runs the warp core at 80% without going to warp, which produces enough heat to kill the virus; however, it also initiates a pulse surge, causing many power conduits to be blown out.

At that moment, another class is in progress in a cargo bay when a power conduit blows and the room begins to fill with noxious gas. One of the trainees is unconscious but Tuvok orders the rest to leave him behind and save themselves. The trainees are angered at his apparent disregard for their friend's life, and initially refuse, but Tuvok forces them out. He then contradicts his own order, going back to save the injured crewman, and in the process succumbs to the gas and passes out. The other trainees work together to rescue Tuvok and their friend. Afterwards, Dalby tells Tuvok that if he is willing to bend Starfleet protocol to save one of them, perhaps they can bend to accept the Starfleet rules after all.

Production
The episode's principal plotline, dealing with Tuvok and his trainees, was originally devised as a subplot for another episode, until the writers decided that they liked it enough to make it the focus of an episode. The producers of the show were disappointed that "Learning Curve" became the default season finale due to scheduling issues with the season, describing it as "a run-of-the-mill episode...it wasn't a cliffhanger. It wasn't a season-ender. It had no bang. We just sort of disappeared." Four other episodes had already been produced, but they were held back until the start of the second season. Schematics used to construct the sets for this episode were among the items sold off in the It's a Wrap! online auction of Star Trek items.

Casting 
The episode includes several guest and co-stars including Armand Schultz, Derek McGrath, Kenny Morrison, Catherine MacNeal, Thomas Dekker, Lindsey Haun, and Majel Barret.

Reception 
Trek Navigator Mark A. Altman gave the episode two and a half stars stating the episode "plays like a lightweight version of the same writers' "Lower Decks"." Doux Reviews notes the reluctant trainees must choose between "..confinement in the brig or being punched.." but called the end "obvious but satisfying", giving it a rating of "one out of four recruits". TV.com lists "Learning Curve" with a rating of 8.1 points out of 10 on 201 User reviews as of 2018.

This episode was noted for using the holodeck as a training simulator aboard the spacecraft. Within the holodeck, special effects visual a Romulan spacecraft is shown.

In 2020, Gizmodo listed this episode as one of the "must watch" episodes from season one of the show.

References

External links

 

Star Trek: Voyager (season 1) episodes
1995 American television episodes
Television episodes directed by David Livingston